King Sihahanu (Skt:Sīṃhahanu) was an ancient monarch and paternal grandfather of Gautama Buddha. He was one of the ruler of Shakya Clan.

Family 

Sihahanu was a son of King Jayasena and brother of Princess Yasodhara.

He married Kaccanā of Devadaha, daughter of Devadahasakka.

Kaccanā and Sihahanu had these children:
King Śuddhodana
Dhotodana
Sakkodana
Sukkadana
Amitodana
Amitā
Pamitā

As a young prince, Śuddhodana excelled in warfare and swordsmanship. After a victorious battle, Sihahanu offered him a boon. He requested permission to marry two beautiful sisters, Maya and Mahāpajābatī Gotamī.

Notes 

Ancient Indian monarchs
Family of Gautama Buddha
Year of birth missing
Year of death missing